Green Reefers is a Norwegian shipping company that owns 24 and operates 5 reefers (refrigerated ships). Based in Bergen, the company operates throughout the North Atlantic, with terminals located in Swinoujscie (Poland), Kaliningrad (Russia), Klaipėda (Lithuania), Måløy and Træna (Norway).

The company used to be listed on the Oslo Stock Exchange. Fully owned by the Caiano Group.  The main cargoes include fish from Northern Europe, juice from Florida, fruits from the United States and meat from Brazil to Russia.

Shipping companies of Norway
Reefer shipping companies
Transport companies of Vestland
Companies based in Bergen
Companies with year of establishment missing
Companies formerly listed on the Oslo Stock Exchange